Baixiang may refer to the following Chinese places:

Baixiang County (柏乡县), a county in Hebei Province, China
Baixiang, Yueyang (柏祥镇), a town of Yueyang County, Hunan Province